Sonic or Sonics may refer to:

Companies 
Sonic Drive-In, an American drive-in fast-food restaurant chain
Sonic (ISP), an Internet provider and CLEC, serving more than 100 California communities
Sonic Foundry, a computer software company which develops programs for editing audio and video
Sonic Healthcare, a company that provides laboratory pathology and radiology services
Sonic Solutions, a company operating in digital-media markets
Sonic Team, a developer of video games
SONIC, a brand name of Sega, S.A. SONIC

Arts and entertainment
Sonic the Hedgehog, a Sega video game franchise
Sonic the Hedgehog (character), the titular character of the Sonic the Hedgehog franchise
Sonic the Hedgehog (1991 video game), the first video game in the Sonic the Hedgehog franchise
Sonic the Hedgehog (film), a 2020 film based on the Sonic the Hedgehog franchise
Sonic screwdriver, a fictional tool in the British science fiction television series Doctor Who
Nickelodeon Sonic, an Indian children's television channel
Sonic "Boom Boom" Renaldi, a character in the Speed Racer film adaptation

Music 
The Sonics, an American band
CHDI-FM, a radio station in Edmonton, Alberta, Canada, named SONiC 102.9
CKKS-FM, a radio station in Chilliwack/Abbotsford/Vancouver, British Columbia, Canada

Science and technology 
Sonics, a branch of acoustics
Theory of sonics, a branch of continuum mechanics
Sonic boom, an audible component of a shock wave in air
Supersonic speed
Hypersonic speed
Sonic hedgehog, a gene and protein named after Sonic the Hedgehog
SONIC (Ethernet controller), a 10 Mbit/s ethernet controller
SONiC (operating system), free and open source network operating system developed by Microsoft
SonicStage, a computer program

Sports 
Seattle SuperSonics, a National Basketball Association team, relocated to Oklahoma as the Thunder
Sonic Motor Racing Services, an Australian motor racing team

Vehicles 
Sonic (train), the name of a Japanese express train
Chevrolet Sonic, the North American successor to the Chevrolet Aveo
Honda Sonic, an underbone motorcycle
Moyes Sonic, an Australian hang glider design
Sonic 23, a Canadian sailboat design
Sonic Spinball, a rollercoaster

See also 

Sonic the Hedgehog (disambiguation)
Supersonic (disambiguation)